The following is a list of Major League Baseball players, retired or active.

Sa through Se

References

External links
Last Names starting with S – Baseball-Reference.com

 Sa